Alive and Feeling Fine is the second studio album by Belgian DJ and record producer Lost Frequencies, succeeding his 2016 album Less Is More. It was released on 4 October 2019 through Found Frequencies, Mostiko Records and Armada Music. It is composed of two parts, the first containing the seven tracks released by the DJ since his 2017 song "Crazy" and also new songs, while the second part primarily contains remixes. In November 2019, the album has been nominated at Music Industry Awards for the award "Best Album of the Year".

Background 
On 15 September 2019, Lost Frequencies announced via Instagram the release date of the album, also posting a photo of its cover. He later indicated, on 30 September, that he would simultaneously release his track "Before Today" featuring Natalie Slade, which has been played for two years in his sets. He commented the song : "It's very different. It's soulful and warm vocals. It's feels maybe almost like African influences, very gospel-ish, but then it goes into electronic music with the guitar sound." A website of the same name as the album was also created to allow fans to pre-save it and go in the draw to win a vinyl edition. Lost Frequencies said about his album :

According to him, the name of the album came to him thanks to the lyrics "I'm alive and I'm feeling fine" in the song "Sun Is Shining", which was released in August 2019. The DJ also indicated the presence of one notable collaboration, with his girlfriend who did the vocals on "Sweet Dreams". Even if, according to him, they usually don't work together to avoid mixing work and their private life, he decided to depart from his habits because he liked how she sang them when he was starting to work on the track. Lost Frequencies decided to debut an Alive and Feeling Fine tour to support the opus and she will perform the song live on his tour. He indicated it will be his first live tour, and it also will "feature him DJing and playing the keyboards, as well as having guitarists and a drummer perform alongside him". He added : "I'm really happy to do something like this and [have] this new challenge. We're bringing really a whole story with the show, and I think for me that's a really big step towards a better performance onstage and a better experience for people to enjoy the evening."

Track listing 
Track listing adapted from iTunes Store, credits adapted from Ultratop.

Charts

Weekly charts

Year-end charts

References 

2019 albums
Armada Music albums
Lost Frequencies albums